7167 Laupheim, provisional designation , is a dark background asteroid from the outer regions of the asteroid belt, approximately  in diameter. It was discovered on 12 October 1985, by American astronomers Carolyn and Eugene Shoemaker at the Palomar Observatory in California. The presumed C-type asteroid has a rotation period of 7.04 hours and was named for Robert Clausen and his team at the public Laupheim Observatory in Germany.

Orbit and classification 

Laupheim is a non-family asteroid from the main belt's background population. It orbits the Sun in the outer main-belt at a distance of 2.5–3.8 AU once every 5 years and 6 months (2,018 days; semi-major axis of 3.13 AU). Its orbit has an eccentricity of 0.21 and an inclination of 23° with respect to the ecliptic. The body's observation arc begins at Palomar in September 1985, about a month before its official discovery observation.

Physical characteristics 

Laupheim is an assumed carbonaceous C-type asteroid.

Rotation period 

In October 2013, a rotational lightcurve of Laupheim was obtained from photometric observations by astronomers at the Palomar Transient Factory in California. Lightcurve analysis gave a rotation period of 7.040 hours with a brightness amplitude of 0.31 magnitude.

Diameter and albedo 

According to the surveys carried out by the Japanese Akari satellite and the NEOWISE mission of NASA's Wide-field Infrared Survey Explorer, Laupheim measures between 17.95 and 23.229 kilometers in diameter and its surface has an albedo between 0.057 and 0.08.

The Collaborative Asteroid Lightcurve Link assumes a standard albedo for a carbonaceous asteroid of 0.057 and calculates a diameter of 17.86 kilometers based on an absolute magnitude of 12.47.

Naming 

This minor planet was named for Robert Clausen (born 1951) and his team at the public Laupheim Observatory in Laupheim, southern Germany. It was named by the discoverer Carolyn Shoemaker who visited the observatory in 1998. Clausen founded an association of amateur astronomers in 1975 which organized traveling astronomical exhibitions and numerous international astronomy festivals. Since 1990, he and his co-workers have also been running a Zeiss planetarium.

The official naming citation was published by the Minor Planet Center on 4 May 1999.

References

External links 
 Find 7167 Laupheim in the night sky
 Asteroid Lightcurve Database (LCDB), query form (info )
 Dictionary of Minor Planet Names, Google books
 Discovery Circumstances: Numbered Minor Planets (5001)-(10000) – Minor Planet Center
 
 

007167
Discoveries by Carolyn S. Shoemaker
Discoveries by Eugene Merle Shoemaker
Named minor planets
7167 Laupheim
19851012